Giorgio Farroni (born 28 September 1976) is an Italian paralympic cyclist who won three medals at the Summer Paralympics.

References

External links
 

1976 births
Living people
Paralympic cyclists of Italy
Paralympic silver medalists for Italy
Paralympic bronze medalists for Italy
Medalists at the 2008 Summer Paralympics
Medalists at the 2012 Summer Paralympics
Medalists at the 2020 Summer Paralympics
Paralympic medalists in cycling
Cyclists at the 2008 Summer Paralympics
Cyclists at the 2012 Summer Paralympics
Cyclists at the 2016 Summer Paralympics
Cyclists at the 2020 Summer Paralympics
People from Fabriano
Sportspeople from the Province of Ancona
Cyclists from Marche
20th-century Italian people
21st-century Italian people